Marisa Zuriel (born August 19, 1982 in Buenos Aires) is an Argentine chess player who holds the FIDE title of Woman International Master.

She won the Argentine women's chess championships of 2005 and 2012.

Zuriel won the 2007 American Continental Women's Chess Championship in Potrero de los Funes, San Luis Province after a playoff match, which ended with an armageddon game, with Sarai Sanchez Castillo.

She played in the Women's World Chess Championship in 2008, 2010 and 2015.

References

External links 

Marisa Zuriel chess games at 365Chess.com

1982 births
Living people
Chess Woman International Masters
Argentine female chess players
Sportspeople from Buenos Aires